Farida Momand (born 14 January 1965) is an Afghan doctor and politician who serves as Minister of Higher Education.

Early life and education
Momand was born in 1965 in the Momand Dara District of Nangarhar Province. She is of Pashtun descent. She studied at Rabia Balkhi High School and received a BA in Medicine from Kabul University.

Career
Momand is a medical doctor and has worked in several government hospitals. She was a professor at Kabul Medical University. Her husband was a spokesman for the Northern Alliance which sought to keep the Taliban from power. When the Taliban took over Kabul in 1996, the family received death threats and fled to Pakistan. They returned in November 2001, when Kabul was liberated. Momand returned to the medical school and was appointed dean. She was also elected to represent female university students and employees.

Momand was one of more than 400 candidates for Kabul Province in the 2005 parliamentary election. She was also a candidate for the 2009 provincial election and the 2010 parliamentary election.

Momand was appointed as Minister of Higher Education in the cabinet of President Ashraf Ghani in April 2015. As Minister, she called for transparency in university examinations, advocated for women in scholarship, and supported the launch of the first programs in gender studies and women's studies at Kabul University.

In 2016, the Wolesi Jirga began impeachment proceedings for ministers who had failed to spend more than 70% of their development budgets for the year. Momand was one of seven ministers dismissed over four days. She was summoned to report on her development budget spending for the year and when she did not appear on the day, was dismissed in her absence. President Ghani called the dismissals "unjustifiable" and urged the Supreme Court to intervene, while CEO Abdullah Abdullah urged the ministers to keep working until the relevant constitutional article was interpreted.

Personal life
Momand is married to Habib Rayed and they have five children.

References

Living people
1965 births
21st-century Afghan women politicians
21st-century Afghan politicians
Kabul University alumni
Academic staff of Kabul University
Afghan pediatricians
Women pediatricians
Pashtun women
Women government ministers of Afghanistan